

Malaconotoidea is a superfamily of passerine birds. They contain a vast diversity of omnivorous and carnivorous songbirds widespread in Africa and Australia, many of which superficially resemble shrikes. It was defined and named by Cacraft and colleagues in 2004 and contains the bushshrikes (Malaconotidae), helmetshrikes (Prionopidae), ioras (Aegithinidae), vangas (Vangidae) and the Australian butcherbirds, magpies, currawongs and woodswallows (Artamidae). Molecular analysis in 2006 added the Bornean bristlehead to the group, though its position in the Malconotoidea is unclear. It was initially thought related to the butcherbirds and woodswallows but now is thought to be an early offshoot.

In 2012, Jerome Fuchs and colleagues extensively analysed the Malaconotoidea (called by them Malaconotidea), using both mitochondrial and nuclear DNA. The resulting tree suggested that the group originated in Australasia and prolifically diversified in Africa after an ancestor crossed to Africa between 45 and 33.7 million years ago during the late Eocene. This is based on the basal position of group comprising the woodswallows and butcherbirds and allies and (most likely) the boatbills. Complicating the picture is that some Malaysian species such as the Bornean bristlehead, flycatcher-shrikes, the Philentomas, and woodshrikes appear to be more closely related to African species.

A cladistic study of the bony characteristics of the skulls of various Malaconotoidea and relatives, and focussing on vangas, published in 2008, found broad agreement in the inclusion of woodswallows, butcherbirds and vangas in Malaconotoidea, but also yielded some results at odds with other studies—the red-backed shrike, crested drongo and magpie-lark were nested within the group. The authors conceded that there were not enough data to conclude these species should be placed here.

The superfamily contains eight families:
 Machaerirhynchidae – boatbills
 Artamidae – woodswallows, butcherbirds, currawongs, and Australian magpie
 Rhagologidae – mottled berryhunter
 Malaconotidae – puffback shrikes, bush shrikes, tchagras, and boubous
 Pityriaseidae – bristlehead
 Aegithinidae – ioras
 Platysteiridae – wattle-eyes and batises
 Vangidae – vangas

References

Bird superfamilies
Passeri